Exelastis crepuscularis is a moth of the family Pterophoridae. It is known from South Africa and São Tomé and Principe.

The larvae feed on Alysicarpus vaginalis.

References

Exelastini
Moths described in 1909
Moths of Asia
Moths of Africa
Insects of São Tomé and Príncipe